The Blanton Log House, in Rio Arriba County, New Mexico near Los Ojos, New Mexico, was listed on the National Register of Historic Places in 1985.

It is a  log house built with horizontal logs with some mud plaster. It has a very steep corrugated metal roof, and vertical planking in both of its gable ends. It has chamfered porch posts.

It was deemed significant as "a well-preserved, slightly-modified example of Hispanic log housing. The dovetail notching, half dovetail joints and steep roof are somewhat unusual. The linear, modular composition, multiple doors and gable doors are typical."

It was altered by an opening cut into one of its short ends so that it could be used as a garage.

References

Log houses in the United States
National Register of Historic Places in Rio Arriba County, New Mexico